Connor Fields (October 10, 1995) is a professional lacrosse player who plays for Archers Lacrosse Club of the Premier Lacrosse League and the Rochester Knighthawks of the National Lacrosse League. He played college lacrosse at the University at Albany, where he was an All-American all four years. He was drafted by the San Diego Seals in the 2018 National Lacrosse League Entry Draft. He was also drafted in Major League Lacrosse by the Charlotte Hounds in 2018.

College career
Fields was ranked as the 15th best player coming out of high school by Inside Lacrosse after four years at Bishop Timon – St. Jude High School. He committed to play for the University at Albany.

Freshman Year
Fields started and scored in every game his freshman year. In his first college game, he scored three goals and had three assists against Drexel. He had 7 goals and 9 points in the first half against Umass-Lowell, his most for a first half in his college career. On March 25, against Harvard, he picked up 8 ground balls, the most in his career. Albany's season ended after losing to Notre Dame in the second round of the 2015 NCAA Division I Men's Lacrosse Championship. At the end of the season, he set the record for goals in a season by a freshman, with 66. He was second in all of division one college lacrosse in average goals per game, with 3.47, and first in the America East Conference. He also made the NCAA All-Rookie team, as well as being an honorable mention All-American.

Sophomore Year
Fields came into the year as an Inside Lacrosse preseason All-American. He once again started every game for the Great Danes. On March 26, against Hartford, Fields tied his career high goals with 7 in a 13-9 victory. In early April, he had back to back 4 goal games, against Umass-Lowell and University of Vermont. Albany's season ended after losing to Syracuse in the first round of the 2016 NCAA Division I Men's Lacrosse Championship He ended the season leading the American East in both goals and points, with 44 and 73, respectively. He was nominated for the Tewaaraton Trophy and was a third team All-American by USILA.

Junior Year
As a junior, Fields was named to the Inside Lacrosse preseason All-American team. He set a career high for single game goals against UMass-Lowell on March 25 with 8. On May 13, during the first round of the 2017 NCAA Division I Men's Lacrosse Championship, he had a career high 3 forced turnovers, as well as 5 points in a win against UNC. They lost to University of Maryland in the next game 18-9 to end the season. He was an Inside Lacrosse and USILA first team All-American  and a Tewaaraton Trophy finalist. He led Division 1 in points per game with 6.5. At some point during the season, Fields hurt his MCL, an injury that would hamper him his senior year.

Senior Year
Fields struggled with knee pain throughout his senior season. Fields set a new career high for assists against Drexel on February 24, with 7. Fields had his career high points (12) and tied his career high in assists (7) against UMass on March 6. The Baltimore Sun named Fields the player of the week for the week of March 13 after scoring four goals and having 2 assists, including the game-winning goal with 76 seconds left. Albany made it to their first ever the Final Four, where they lost to the Yale. Fields had at least 3 points in all three games and was named to the All-Tournament team. Fields was once again named a USILA and Inside Lacrosse All-American, as well as being a Tewaaraton nominee for the third time. After the season it was revealed he'd been playing with a torn ACL, sprained MCL and hurt meniscus, which he'd suffered during the March 24 victory over UMass-Lowell and worsened during the April 22 loss to Yale.

Statistics

 5th all-time in NCAA single-season points
 3rd in career goals
 3rd in career points

Professional career

MLL
Fields was drafted #3 overall by the Charlotte Hounds in the 2018 Major League Lacrosse draft. He scored his first two career goals on June 23, 2018 against the Florida Launch. His season was cut short after three games due to his lingering knee injury from college. He got surgery in Buffalo for his knee shortly after playing in his final MLL game that season.

NLL
Fields was selected 10th overall in the 2018 National Lacrosse League Entry Draft by the San Diego Seals. In week 17,  of the 2018 NLL season, after sitting out the rest of the season due to knee surgery, Fields made his debut. He scored his first career goal and had his first career assist against the New England Black Wolves. He only played one more regular season game that season, where he had a pair of assists. In the playoffs, Fields was able to participate in the playoffs for the Seals, where he scored a goal in an 11-12 loss.

Fields was traded from San Diego to the Buffalo Bandits on August 28, 2021 in exchange for the 13th overall pick in the 2021 NLL Draft and a second round pick in 2022.

Following one season with the Bandits, Fields was selected by the Las Vegas Desert Dogs in the 2022 NLL Expansion Draft and then immediately traded to the Rochester Knighthawks along with the first overall pick in the 2022 NLL Entry Draft in exchange for Charlie Bertrand, their first, fourth, and sixth round picks in the same draft, and their first round pick of the 2023 entry draft.

PLL
Fields became a member of Chaos Lacrosse Club of Paul Rabil’s new league, the Premier Lacrosse League for the 2019 Premier Lacrosse League season. He made the league's first ever Premier Lacrosse League All-Star Game as a member of Team Rambo. He participated in the Adidas Freestyle Challenge during all-star weekend as well. Fields ended the season tied for second in goals. He made the 2019 PLL all pro team.

Fields was traded to Archers Lacrosse Club on February 25, 2021 in exchange for midfielder Ian MacKay.

NLL Statistics

PLL Statistics

Personal life
Fields is the son of Jennifer and Peter Fields and has a brother named Peter. He has dual citizenship with the United States and Canada. He was on Canada's tryout roster for the 2018 World Lacrosse Championship. However, for the 2019 World Indoor Lacrosse Championship, Fields tried out for Team USA.

See also
2018 NCAA Division I Men's Lacrosse Championship
NCAA Men's Division I Lacrosse Records

References

Premier Lacrosse League players
Charlotte Hounds players
Albany Great Danes men's lacrosse players
Lacrosse players from New York (state)
Canadian lacrosse players
Living people
1995 births
People from East Amherst, New York
Sportspeople from Erie County, New York
San Diego Seals players
Buffalo Bandits players